Ingra Manecke (born 31 March 1956) is a German athlete. She competed in the women's discus throw at the 1984 Summer Olympics.

References

1956 births
Living people
Athletes (track and field) at the 1984 Summer Olympics
German female discus throwers
Olympic athletes of West Germany
Place of birth missing (living people)